Basilio Cueria Obrit (June 14, 1898 – May 8, 1959) was a Cuban infielder in the Negro leagues and Cuban League in the 1920s.

A native of Marianao, Cuba, Cueria made his Negro leagues debut in 1921 with the All Cubans. The following season, he played for the Cuban Stars (West). Cueria also played for the Marianao club in the Cuban League in 1922–1923. He died in New York, New York in 1959 at age 60.

References

External links
 and Baseball-Reference Black Baseball stats and Seamheads

1898 births
1959 deaths
All Cubans players
Cuban Stars (West) players
Marianao players
Cuban expatriate baseball players in the United States
Burials at Long Island National Cemetery